"Better than Revenge" is a song written and recorded by American singer-songwriter Taylor Swift for her third studio album, Speak Now (2010). Produced by Swift and Nathan Chapman, the electric guitar-driven pop punk song is about Swift's plea for vengeance against a romantic rival. Swift included the song on the set list of her Speak Now World Tour (2011–2012).

Upon Speak Now release in 2010, "Better than Revenge" charted on the Canadian Hot 100 (number 73) and the US Billboard Hot 100 (number 56). It was certified gold by the Recording Industry Association of America (RIAA). Though some music critics found the song entertaining, some media took issue with its slut-shaming lyrics, deeming them shortsighted and shallow.

Background and release

Taylor Swift released her third studio album, Speak Now, on October 25, 2010. She wrote all 14 album tracks by herself and conceived Speak Now as a loose concept album about the confessions she wanted but never had the chance to make to people she had met. The album's lyrics depart from the high school perspectives of her previous records, certain songs containing vengeful messages towards those who had wronged her. One of such songs, "Better than Revenge", was directed at a romantic rival. Swift did not reveal the subject of the song. "Better than Revenge" is track number 10 on Speak Now, produced by Swift and Nathan Chapman.

Swift included the song on the set list of her Speak Now World Tour (2011–2012). During the shows, she sang the song on top of a bridge, dressed in a red sequined mini-dress and boots, and play-fought with one of her dancers.

Music and lyrics
"Better than Revenge" is an electric guitar-driven pop punk song. According to Ann Powers of the Los Angeles Times, Swift's vocals on the song expanded considerably. The lyrics are about Swift's plea for vengeance against a romantic rival. Compared to her previous songs about romantic fantasy, "Better than Revenge" features a more real-life perspective on love. In the refrain, Swift describes the rival as an "actress" who is "known for the things that she does on the mattress". Maura Johnston writing for New York cited this part as one of a few instances of Speak Now where Swift writes about sexual experiences, a new theme for her at the time.

Critical reception
In an American Songwriter review of Speak Now, Rick Moore contended that "Better than Revenge" is the one song that "shows Swift isn't the naïve young role model that so many parents perceive her to be", citing the "on the mattress" lyrics. Allison Stewart of The Washington Post considered the said lyrics immature, but acknowledged that the song, among others such as "Dear John" or "Innocent", moves Swift's image from the "unearthly sweetness" of her previous songs. In BBC Music, Matthew Horton deemed it one of Speak Now weaker songs.

Slant Magazine writer Jonathan Keefe was critical of "Better than Revenge", deeming the track overall shallow and shortsighted because it indulged in self-righteousness: "Her narrators often seem to lack insight because Swift writes with the point of view that hers is the only story to be told." John J. Moser of The Morning Call remarked that the immature "Better than Revenge", among other songs, backfired Swift's self-proclaimed maturity on Speak Now: "Instead of conveying mature emotions, the songs convey a teen-age girl's concepts of mature emotions ... If Swift is so mature, why is she so bent on revenge, anyway?"

In a more positive vein, Mikael Wood from Spin deemed "Better than Revenge" entertaining. Leah Greenbalt of Entertainment Weekly considered the "surprisingly sharp-toothed" song a step forward from Swift's previous "twitterpated heart of teendom", and Steve Hyden of The A.V. Club considered the track, among others about vengeance, one of Speak Now strongest: "Swift's niftiest trick is being at her most likeable when she’s indulging in such overt nastiness." Rolling Stone featured the song on their 2015 list of "Country's 20 Best Revenge Songs": "Taylor Swift has made a multi-million dollar career out of getting lyrical revenge, with ["Better than Revenge"] perhaps packing the strongest punch."

Commentary and aftermath
Contemporary media reacted negatively to "Better than Revenge", citing its narrative as slut-shaming. As observed by Nate Jones for Vulture, the song solidified Swift's image as anti-feminist; some media had previously accused Swift of being hostile to feminism through lyrics of certain songs such as "Fifteen", which critics deemed sex-negative; and "You Belong with Me", which is about her competing with another girl for a boy's love. Some feminist writers alleged Swift of capitalizing on female-female rivalries. In 2014, Swift told The Guardian that she identified as a feminist and spoke about the song: "I was 18 when I wrote that. That's the age you are when you think someone can actually take your boyfriend. Then you grow up and realize no one can take someone from you if they don't want to leave."

Even after Swift claimed to be a feminist, critics continued to take issue with her "calculated" image, deeming her feminist ideology self-interested. As Swift's success grew with her subsequent pop albums, the media focused on the problematic lyrics of "Better than Revenge" to question Swift's feminist identity. In a commentary for New Statesman in 2017, Annie Leszkiewicz considered "Better than Revenge" a misstep for Swift's artistry, on the grounds that it indulged in celebrity and tarnished her wholesome public image that she had curated. Journalists indicated that "Better than Revenge" was the precedent to many of Swift's subsequent songs about celebrity and vengeance, notably "Bad Blood" (2015) and "Look What You Made Me Do" (2017), as her personal life became sensationalized in the press.

Commercial performance
After Speak Now was released, "Better than Revenge" entered and peaked at number 73 on the Canadian Hot 100. In the United States, the song peaked at number 56 on the Billboard Hot 100 and number six on the Country Digital Song Sales chart. In 2014, the Recording Industry Association of America (RIAA) certified the track gold for surpassing 500,000 units based on sales and streaming.

Charts

Certification

References

2010 songs
Taylor Swift songs
Songs written by Taylor Swift
Song recordings produced by Taylor Swift
Song recordings produced by Nathan Chapman (record producer)
American pop punk songs
Songs about revenge